Robert Hackett may refer to:
 Bobby Hackett (1915–1976), Irish-American jazz musician
 Bobby Hackett (swimmer) (born 1959), American former swimmer
 Robert A. Hackett, professor and researcher at the School of Communication, Simon Fraser University, Vancouver
 Robert Hackett (soldier), Scottish soldier